Nogoum FM is the first private radio station in Egypt, started in 2003, based in the Egyptian Media Production City. It is owned by Taher Helmy and the Good News Company, which in turn is owned by Emad El Din Adeeband and his family members.

Nugoom FM broadcasts on frequency FM 100.6 in Cairo and airs a variety of daily social, artistic, cultural, political, sports, women, and children's programs. It won best radio station in the sixth Arab Satellite Festival in 2015; it also started Nogoum FM TV channel in May 2015.

See also 
 Media in Egypt

References 

Radio stations in Egypt
2003 establishments in Egypt